PVO may refer to:

Businesses, military and organisations
 Private voluntary organization
 Pohjolan Voima Oy, a Finnish energy company
 Protivo-Vozdushnaya Oborona, the air defence forces branch of the Soviet and Russian military
 Great Fatherland Party, a political party in Russia

People
 Peter van Onselen (born 1976), Australian television presenter and political writer
 PVO NewsDay, an Australian political program hosted by Peter van Onselen, originally known as PVO NewsHour

Technology
 Pioneer Venus Orbiter
Performance Vehicle Operations, part of DaimlerChrysler and now Street & Racing Technology
 Probabilistic velocity obstacle, a type of velocity obstacle

Other uses
 PVO (album)
 Reales Tamarindos Airport, Ecuador (IATA airport code: PVO)